The Asia/Oceania Zone was one of the four zones within Group 3 of the regional Davis Cup competition in 2015. The zone's competition was held in round robin format in Kuala Lumpur, Malaysia, in March 2015. The eight competing nations were divided into two pools of four. The winners and runners up from each pool played off to determine the two nations to be promoted to Asia/Oceania Zone Group II in 2016, while the remaining nations played to off to determine the two nations to be relegated to Asia/Oceania Zone Group IV in 2016.

Participating nations

Draw

The eight teams were divided into two pools of four, using the following seeding:

{| class="wikitable"
!width=25%|Pot 1
!width=25%|Pot 2
!width=25%|Pot 3
!width=25%|Pot 4
|-
|
 
 
|
  
 
|
  
 
|
  
 
|}

The winner of each pool plays off against the runner-up of the other pool, and the two winners of these play-offs are promoted to Asia/Oceania Zone Group II in 2016. The third placed team in each pool plays off against the fourth placed team in the other pool, and the two losers of these play-offs are relegated to Asia/Oceania Zone Group IV in 2016.

The group was staged from the 25th to 28 March 2015 at the Kompleks Tenis Tun Abd Razak at the National Tennis Centre in Kuala Lumpur, Malaysia.

Pool A

Pool B

First round

Pool A

Malaysia vs. Qatar

Hong Kong vs. Saudi Arabia

Malaysia vs. Hong Kong

Saudi Arabia vs. Qatar

Malaysia vs. Saudi Arabia

Hong Kong vs. Qatar

Pool B

Vietnam vs. Turkmenistan

Syria vs. Cambodia

Vietnam vs. Syria

Cambodia vs. Turkmenistan

Vietnam vs. Cambodia

Syria vs. Turkmenistan

Play-offs

Promotion

Malaysia vs. Turkmenistan

Vietnam vs. Hong Kong

Relegation

Cambodia vs. Qatar

Syria vs. Saudi Arabia

Outcomes
However, it was later decided by the Davis Cup Committee that Asia/Oceania Zone Group III would be expanded from eight teams to nine in 2016, and Qatar's relegation was therefore overturned.

References

2015 Davis Cup Asia/Oceania Zone
Davis Cup Asia/Oceania Zone